Tap out or Tapout can refer to:

 Tap out, submission in combat sport
 Tapout (clothing brand)
 Tapout (TV series)
 UFC: Tapout, a video game
 Tap-Out (Transformers), the name of two fictional characters
 "Tapout" (song), a 2013 song by Rich Gang
 "Tap Out", a 2011 song by Keke Wyatt from the album Unbelievable
 "Tap Out", song by Jay Rock ft. Jeremih from the album Redemption

See also

Tap (disambiguation)
Tape-out